Missouri Wesleyan College was a college in Cameron, Missouri, from 1883 until 1930.

The school opened as the Cameron Institute and became the college in 1887 after the Methodists acquired it.

The college was best known for its music department. Allie Luse Dick served as director of music (1892-95).

In 1912, it was among the original founders of the Mid-America Intercollegiate Athletics Association. In 1922 it was among the first owners of a radio station WFAQ operating initially on 834 kc. The station closed in 1924.

The school merged with Baker University in 1926 and closed in 1930.

Notable alumni
 Sam A. Baker, Missouri's 36th governor

References

 
1883 establishments in Missouri
1930 disestablishments in Missouri
Buildings and structures in Clinton County, Missouri
Educational institutions established in 1883
Educational institutions disestablished in 1930
Defunct private universities and colleges in Missouri